The Minnesota Loons are a USA Hockey-sanctioned Tier III Junior ice hockey team playing in the North American 3 Hockey League (NA3HL). The team plays their home games at Breezy Point Ice Arena in Breezy Point, Minnesota. The organization was originally known as the Breezy Point North Stars and was founded as a non-profit corporation operated by Whitebirch, Inc.

History
Established in 2012, the North Stars were originally managed by Joe Bergquist. The first head coach was Brian Henrichs. The first victory in franchise history came in their ninth league game, a 3–2 win over the Alexandria Blizzard on October 19, 2012.

After two seasons and just 12 victories, Henrichs was replaced by Jeff Worlton, a former minor league player and head coach in the North American Hockey League. In 2016, Worlton would be hired mid-season by the North American Hockey League's Kenai River Brown Bears and assistant coach Josh Dallman would take over as head coach. At the end of the 2015–16 season, Dallman would also leave to work for Worlton again in Kenai and the North Stars would hire Jon Jonasson, former head coach of the Helena Bighorns, as head coach for 2016–17. Jonasson left after one season and was replaced by DJ Vold. Former professional player Mike Muller was hired as the head coach for the 2019–20 season.

After the 2019–20 season, the team stated it would not be participating in the following season. After one dormant season, the franchise was sold in 2021 to MHCPA, LLC, an ownership group composed of Craig Larson, Anthony Maucieri, and former NHL player Chris Stewart. The franchise was reactivated as the Minnesota Loons for the 2021–22 season and the new management re-hired Muller as head coach.

Season-by-season records

Alumni
The North Stars have had a number of alumni move on to collegiate programs and higher levels of junior ice hockey in the United States and Canada.

References

External links
 Minnesota Loons website
 NA3HL website

Ice hockey in Minnesota
Ice hockey teams in Minnesota
2012 establishments in Minnesota
Ice hockey clubs established in 2012
Crow Wing County, Minnesota